Raska Lukwiya (died August 12, 2006) was the third highest-ranking leader of the Lord's Resistance Army rebel group founded in northern Uganda. Believed to be a native of Uganda's northern Gulu District, Lukwiya served successively as Brigade General, Deputy Army Commander and Army Commander of the LRA, the last being the highest LRA rank after those held by Joseph Kony and Vincent Otti.

He was one of five LRA leaders for whom the International Criminal Court issued their first ever warrants in June 2005 and was charged with three counts: one of enslavement constituting a crime against humanity and one count each of cruel treatment and attacks on civilians constituting war crimes.

He was killed in fighting with the government Uganda People's Defence Force while peace negotiations brokered by the government of Southern Sudan were still underway.

References

Year of birth missing
2006 deaths
Lord's Resistance Army rebels
People indicted by the International Criminal Court
People indicted for crimes against humanity
People indicted for war crimes